Allieae is a tribe of plants belonging to the subfamily Allioideae of the Amaryllis family (Amaryllidaceae). It comprises a single genus, Allium, distributed in temperate zones of the Northern Hemisphere.

Description 
Characterised by simple or prolific bulbs, sometimes with lateral rhizomes. Leaf sheaths long, tepals free and corona absent. Spathe formed from 2–5 bracts. Style more or less gynobasic. Ovary usually has two ovules per locule. One genus and over 500 species. Distributed over all the Northern hemisphere.

References

Bibliography

Sources 
 Missouri Botanical Garden

Allioideae
Monocot tribes
Monotypic plant taxa